Jerry Hanson Nuzum (September 8, 1923April 23, 1997) was a professional American football player who played running back for four seasons for the Pittsburgh Steelers.

References

External links
 100 Facts about New Mexico

1923 births
1997 deaths
People from Clovis, New Mexico
Players of American football from New Mexico
American football running backs
New Mexico State Aggies football players
Pittsburgh Steelers players